Jun Fujiwara, (born 23 November 1982), is a Japanese futsal player who plays for Bardral Urayasu and the Japanese national futsal team.

Clubs 
 2008-2010 Shriker Osaka
 2010- Bardral Urayasu

Titles 
 F.League Ocean Cup (2)
 2008, 2009

References

External links
FIFA profile

1982 births
Living people
Futsal goalkeepers
Japanese men's futsal players
Shriker Osaka players
Bardral Urayasu players
People from Shizuoka Prefecture